Hizla is the largest upazila (sub-district) of southern Bangladesh's Barisal District.

Geography
Hizla Upazila (barisal district) area 515.36 km2, located in between 22°50' and 23°05' north latitudes and in between 90°25' and 90°43' east longitudes. It is bounded by Ghosairhat and Haimchar upazilas on the north, Mehendiganj upazila on the south, Muladi upazila on the west.

Hijla Upazila is located in Kolghes of Shariatpur district of Dhaka division north of Barishal on the map of the country. Ghosairhat Upazila of Shariatpur district on the north, Haimchar Upazila of Chandpur district on the northeast, Mehendiganj Upazila on the south, Raipur Upazila of Noakhali district on the east, and Muladi Upazila on the west. The distance from the district headquarters is 50 km. It is an area surrounded by rivers.

Jayanti, Nayabhangani, Meghna, Lower Meghna, and Azimpur rivers are flooded.

History
Hizla, along with Mehendiganj, was formerly known as North Shahbazpur. During the Company rule in Bengal, Mawlana Hakim Ahsanullah of Noakhali, a descendant of Shaykh Thakur Chandpuri, was granted a taluk in the village of Gaurabadi in Hizla after treating Prafullanath Tagore, the zamindar of Idilpur and North Shahbazpur. However, Ahsanullah died and the taluk was inherited by his two nephews, Mawlana Abdur Rahim and Dr. Fazlur Rahman. They relocated to Gaurabadi and established the Mia family of Gaurabadi. Their descendant, Moulvi Saadat Husayn Mia, became a leading judge of Barisal, and his son, Hedayet Hossain Morshed, was a journalist and litterateur.

During the Bangladesh Liberation War of 1971, base commanders Bir Protik Qazi Anwar Husayn of Hizla, Qutub Uddin of Muladi and Abdul Quddus Mollah of Mehendiganj led the Bengali freedom fighters in conducting an operation in Hizla, Mehendiganj and Muladi against the Pakistan Army and their collaborators. Many freedom fighters from Hizla were martyred during the war including Havildar Shah Alam of Goalbaor (martyred in Comilla), Naik Azizur Rahman of Tetulia (martyred in Comilla), EPR Havildar Nur Muhammad (martyred in Jessore) and Sipahi Abdul Wajid Palpari (martyred in Rajshahi). Eight innocent people were also killed in Hizla such as Husayn Ali (a teacher from Palpara village), Sultan Jamadar Dadpuri and Ashrab Ali. Shafiqul Manan of Teturia village left his role as Professor of Economics at the Patarhat College to join the war. The Pakistan Army collaborators arrested him in Barisal and murdered him on the banks of the Kirtankhola river. The status of Hizla Thana was upgraded to upazila (sub-district) in 1983 as part of the President of Bangladesh Hussain Muhammad Ershad's decentralisation programme.

Demographics
According to the 1991 Bangladesh census, Hizla had a population of 166,265. Males constituted 52.76% of the population, and females 47.24%. The population aged 18 or over was 75,315. Hizla had an average literacy rate of 27.7% (7+ years), the national average being 32.4%.

Administration
Hizla Upazila is divided into seven union parishads: Bara Jalia, Dhulkhola, Guabaria, Harinathpur, Hizla Gaurabdi, Kuchaipatti, and Memania. The union parishads are subdivided into 139 mauzas and 112 villages.

Upazila Nirbahi Officer: Kaniz Fatema Tania Bilai

Chairmen

Notable people
AKM Nurul Karim Khair, wartime parliamentarian

See also
 Upazilas of Bangladesh
 Districts of Bangladesh
 Divisions of Bangladesh

References

Upazilas of Barisal District